Compliments of Mister Flow or Mister Flow is a 1936 French mystery film directed by Robert Siodmak and starring Fernand Gravey, Edwige Feuillère and Louis Jouvet. It was based on the 1927   novel Mister Flow by Gaston Leroux. It was shot at the Billancourt Studios in Paris. The film's sets were designed by the art directors Robert Gys and Léon Barsacq.

Cast
 Fernand Gravey as Antonin Rose 
 Edwige Feuillère as Lady Helena Scarlett 
 Louis Jouvet as Durin / Mr. Flow 
 Jean Périer as Lord Philippe Scarlett 
 Vladimir Sokoloff as Merlow 
 Jim Gérald as Le Cubain 
 Jean Wall as Pierre 
 Mila Parély as Marceline 
 Victor Vina as Garber
 Philippe Richard as Le procureur  
 Tsugundo Maki as Maki  
 Yves Gladine as Un inspecteur  
 Marguerite de Morlaye 
 Myno Burney 
 Léon Arvel  
 Georges Cahuzac

References

Bibliography 
 Greco, Joseph. The File on Robert Siodmak in Hollywood, 1941-1951. Universal-Publishers, 1999.

External links 
 

1936 films
French mystery films
1936 mystery films
1930s French-language films
Films based on French novels
Films based on works by Gaston Leroux
Films directed by Robert Siodmak
Films scored by Michel Michelet
French black-and-white films
Films shot at Billancourt Studios
1930s French films